Signal word may refer to:

 A type of warning label in a Toxicity Class regulatory system
 Word (computer architecture), a fixed-sized group of bits handled as a unit by a computer processor
 A fixed-sized group of bits handled as a unit by asynchronous serial communication hardware
 Something in a complete sentence referring to an emotion to give info and explain sentences.